Nassarius gaudiosus, common name the gaudy nassa, is a species of sea snail, a marine gastropod mollusk in the family Nassariidae, the Nassa mud snails or dog whelks.

Description
The length of the shell varies between 15 mm and 29 mm.

Distribution
This species occurs in the Indian Ocean off Madagascar, Aldabra, Chagos, the Mascarene Basin and Mauritius; in Hawaii (Maui); and in the West Pacific.

References

 Dautzenberg, Ph. (1929). Contribution à l'étude de la faune de Madagascar: Mollusca marina testacea. Faune des colonies françaises, III(fasc. 4). Société d'Editions géographiques, maritimes et coloniales: Paris. 321–636, plates IV-VII pp.
 Cernohorsky W. O. (1984). Systematics of the family Nassariidae (Mollusca: Gastropoda). Bulletin of the Auckland Institute and Museum 14: 1–356.
 Drivas, J. & M. Jay (1988). Coquillages de La Réunion et de l'île Maurice
 Michel, C. (1988). Marine molluscs of Mauritius. Editions de l'Ocean Indien. Stanley, Rose Hill. Mauritius
 Severns M. (2011) Shells of the Hawaiian Islands – The Sea Shells. Conchbooks, Hackenheim. 564 pp.

External links
 

Nassariidae
Gastropods described in 1844